Steniodes gelliasalis is a moth in the family Crambidae. It was described by Francis Walker in 1859. It is found in Brazil, Colombia and the West Indies, where it has been recorded from Jamaica.

The wingspan is 13–15 mm.

References

Moths described in 1859
Spilomelinae